Macrocarpaea harlingii is a species of plant in the Gentianaceae family. It is endemic to Ecuador.  Its natural habitat is subtropical or tropical moist montane forests.

References

Endemic flora of Ecuador
Macrocarpaea
Vulnerable plants
Taxonomy articles created by Polbot